Sergio Buzó (born January 10, 1977) is a self-taught Paraguayan artist who is best known for his pieces created from repurposed materials.  Buzó currently resides in the artisan town of Areguá where he works on his most notable collection, Nano Guaraní. In 2012, Buzó won second place in the Augusto Roa Bastos Visual Art Contest for a cash prize of Gs 3,000,000. However, of the 34 participants, the judges decided to not award the first, ninth, and tenth place spots.

Notes

1977 births
Living people
Paraguayan artists
People from Areguá